Naujaberžė is a village in Kėdainiai district municipality, in Kaunas County, in central Lithuania. According to the 2011 census, the village has a population of 0 people. The village was depopulated during Soviet land improvement program (1979 census was the last, when population in Naujaberžė was detected).

Demography

References

Villages in Kaunas County
Kėdainiai District Municipality